Katarina Lavtar (born 23 March 1988) is a World Cup alpine ski racer from Slovenia.

Lavtar made her World Cup debut March 2009 in Ofterschwang, Germany. She participated at the 2013 World Ski Championships, where she achieved a 27th place in Slalom. Lavtar will represent Slovenia at the 2014 Winter Olympics in Slalom and Giant Slalom.

References

1988 births
Living people
Slovenian female alpine skiers
Alpine skiers at the 2014 Winter Olympics
Olympic alpine skiers of Slovenia